is a Japanese comedy drama series that first aired on TBS in 1987. Masakazu Tamura gained new popularity through the drama. Also, three special editions of the drama were produced later.

Kagami Ryutarō is a News presenter. He is a playboy, but suddenly he becomes the father of three daughters.

Cast
 Masakazu Tamura as Kagami Ryutarō
 Atsuko Asano as Yonezaki Miyuki
 Mieko Suzuki as Suzuki Megumi
 Chikako Otsuka as Otsuka Megumi
 Mari Nishio as Nishio Megumi
 Jūkei Fujioka as director of The Press
 George Tokoro as Matsumoto Tamotsu
 Rumi Matsumoto as Matsumoto Fumiko
Shigeru Kobayashi as a Caster

Tv specials
Papa wa Newscaster special (October 2, 1987) Guest tarring, Honami Suzuki, Jun Fubuki
Papa wa Newscaster Oshōgatsu special (January 2, 1989) Guest tarring, Naoko Ken, Yumi Shirakawa, Hibari Misora
Papa wa Newscaster Kaetekita Kagami Ryutarō (September 30, 1994) Guest tarring, Isao Hashizume, Takako Tokiwa, Masatoshi Hamada

References

1987 Japanese television series debuts
1987 Japanese television series endings
Japanese drama television series
TBS Television (Japan) dramas
Television shows written by Kazuhiko Ban
Japanese comedy television series